Payne Creek may refer to:

Payne Creek (Antarctica), a cove in South Georgia
Payne Creek (Florida), a stream in Hardee and Polk counties
Payne Creek (Virginia), a stream in  Buckingham Virginia